Alejandro Tabilo (born 2 June 1997) is a Chilean tennis player.

Tabilo has a career high ATP singles ranking of World No. 64 achieved on 25 July 2022. He also has a career high ATP doubles ranking of World No. 249 achieved on 22 February 2021. He is currently the No. 1 Chilean player. He participated at the 2020 ATP Cup and the 2022 ATP Cup with the Chilean team as the No. 2 player.

Tabilo represents Chile at the Davis Cup, where he has a W/L record of 1–3. He participated in his first tie against Germany in a doubles rubber against Kevin Krawietz and Andreas Mies.

Professional career

2020: Grand Slam debut, top 200 debut
At his first tournament of the year, Tabilo qualified for his first Grand Slam at the 2020 Australian Open. He defeated fellow qualifier Daniel Elahi Galán in the first round, losing to John Isner in straight sets in the second round. This run resulted in his first top 200 ranking, reaching no. 172, a career-high at that moment.

Tabilo played home country tournament 2020 Chile Open via wildcard, and defeated Paolo Lorenzi in the first round, losing to Casper Ruud in the second round.

In September, Tabilo reached his career-high ranking of World No. 156. He finished the year at No. 169.

2021: Masters 1000 debut, First Challenger title, top 150 debut
Tabilo tried to repeat his run on the 2021 Australian Open, but lost in first round of qualifying to Hugo Dellien.

At 2021 Chile Open, Tabilo won a spot through the qualifying tournament, and won his first round match to Jozef Kovalík. He lost to fellow chilean and eventual champion Cristian Garín in the second round.

Tabilo qualified to the main draw of 2021 Miami Open, his first Masters 1000 tournament. He lost to Mikael Ymer in the first round.

In July, Alejandro reached his first Challenger final, at the Lexington Challenger. He lost the title to Jason Kubler.

In October, Tabilo qualified to the main draw of 2021 BNP Paribas Open, and got his first win on a Masters 1000 level, defeating Denis Kudla. He lost to Matteo Berrettini in the second round, in his first match against a top 10 player.

The following month, Tabilo reached his second Challenger final at Guayaquil, Ecuador. He won his first Challenger title defeating Jesper de Jong in the final. The title put Tabilo at a ranking of World No. 140, becoming the No. 2 Chilean ranked singles player, after Cristian Garín.

2022: ATP Cup, Return to Grand Slams, First ATP final, Top 65, Chilean No. 1 
Tabilo participated in the 2022 ATP Cup where Chile defeated Norway (won his singles match against Viktor Durasovic) and Serbia in singles and in doubles partnering Tomás Barrios Vera but lost to Spain and Chile finished second in group A.

Tabilo qualified for 2022 Australian Open after beating Australian local James McCabe in three sets, followed by victories over Constant Lestienne and Elias Ymer in straight sets. He lost to 31st seed Carlos Alcaraz in the first round.

In February, he reached his first ever ATP final at the Córdoba Open as a qualifier, defeating Francisco Cerúndolo, Carlos Taberner, Sebastian Baez and World No. 14 and the tournament's top seed Diego Schwartzman each in straight sets. He lost in the final to Albert Ramos-Viñolas 6–4, 3–6, 4–6, despite holding a double break lead at 4–1  (30 - 15) in the third set.

At the 2022 Chile Open he reached the semifinals as a wildcard defeating top seed and compatriot Christian Garin and sixth seed Miomir Kecmanovic in the quarterfinals. As a result he made his top 100 debut at World No. 98 on 28 February 2022.

He made his debut at the 2022 Wimbledon Championships and recorded his first win at this Major defeating Laslo Đere in a tight five set match with a super tiebreak in the fifth. He reached a career high ranking of world No. 68 on 18 July 2022 and a week later another career high of No. 64 and became the Chilean player No. 1. 

He also recorded his first victory at the US Open defeating Kamil Majchrzak.

2023: Masters 1000 fourth round
At the 2023 BNP Paribas Open as a qualifier, he reached the fourth round of a Masters for the first time in his career defeating another fellow qualifier Maximilian Marterer, 32nd seed Maxime Cressy and Jordan Thompson.

Performance timelines

Singles 
Current through the 2023 BNP Paribas Open.

Doubles

ATP career finals

Singles: 1 (1 runner-up)

ATP Challenger/ITF Circuit Career finals

Singles: 11 (4 titles, 7 runner-ups)

Doubles: 10 (5 titles, 5 runner-ups)

Record against top 10 players 
Tabilo's record against players who have been ranked in the top 10, with those who are active in boldface. Only ATP Tour main draw matches are considered:

Record against No. 11–20 players
Tabilo's record against players who have been ranked world No. 11–20:

  Cristian Garín 2–1
  Taylor Fritz 0–1
  Aslan Karatsev 0–1
  Albert Ramos Viñolas 0–1

* Statistics correct .

Davis Cup

Participations (3–4)

   indicates the outcome of the Davis Cup match followed by the score, date, place of event, the zonal classification and its phase, and the court surface.

References

External links

 
 
 

1997 births
Living people
Chilean male tennis players
Citizens of Chile through descent
Naturalized citizens of Chile
Canadian male tennis players
Canadian people of Chilean descent
Sportspeople of Chilean descent
Tennis players from Toronto
Tennis players from Santiago
Tennis players at the 2019 Pan American Games
Pan American Games competitors for Chile